Garrigues-Sainte-Eulalie (Provençal: Garriga e Senta Olha) is a commune in the Gard department in southern France.

Population
The residents are called Garrigois.

History
Traces of the early peoples of the "Fontbouisse culture" have been discovered, as well as many Roman ruins. The area was a feudal domain belonging to the Duke of Uzès.

Before 1789 this commune was in two parts: Garrigues and Sainte-Eulalie. During the French Revolution the two communes were combined and given the name Canteperdrix. In 1814 the combined commune was maintained under the name Garrigues-et-Sainte Eulalie, and on 16 February 1976 the current hyphenated form was adopted.

Economy
The local economy includes general agriculture, vineyards. orchards and sheep raising.

Architecture
The 19th century Sainte-Eulalie Church was built on the ruins of a former fortified castle, which burned in 1704. Its tower is now the clock-tower of the church. The castle was deeded to the Bourdic factory in the 19th century. There is a later, 19th century, castle in the Garrigues region of the town.

See also
Communes of the Gard department

References

External links

 Encyclopedia of French towns (in French)

Communes of Gard